Hutmarah is a village in Anantnag East tehsil in Anantnag district in the Indian union territory of Jammu and Kashmir. It is one of 105 villages in Anantnag East Tehsil  Block  Mattan along with villages like Seer hamdan and Mattan. It is divided into 9 main parts which are Hargam, Malpora, Nayakpora, Dangerpora, Sikh Mohalla, Peer Mohalla, Nai basti and Noor colony. The village is situated on the banks of Lidder River.Muslims, Hindus and Sikhs live  together  in this village.Moreover, the entire village lives in peace and harmony and there is no conflict of any kind. Villagers come forward in each other sorrows and happiness and they are of helpful nature.

Demographics
The population of Hutmarah was 2,885 at the 2011 Indian census, of which 1,398 were male and 1,487 were female.

References 

Villages in Anantnag district